Brauer's burrowing skink (Janetaescincus braueri), also known commonly as Brauer's skink, is a species of lizard in the family Scincidae. The species is endemic to the Seychelles.

Etymology
The specific name, braueri, is in honor of German zoologist August Bernhard Brauer.

Geographic range
J. braueri is found only in the Seychelles, where it occurs on the islands Mahé and Silhouette.

Habitat

Reproduction
J. braueri is oviparous.

Conservation status
J. braueri is threatened by habitat loss.

References

Further reading
Boettger O (1896). "Neue Kriechthiere (Scelotes, Arthroleptis) von den Seychellen ". Zoologischer Anzeiger 19: 349–351. (Scelotes braueri, new species, pp. 349–350).
Greer AE (1970). "The Systematics and Evolution of the Subsaharan Africa, Seychelles, and Mauritius Scincine Scincid Lizards". Bulletin of the Museum of Comparative Zoology, Harvard University 140 (1): 1-24. (Janetaescincus braueri, new combination, pp. 18, 22).

Janetaescincus
Reptiles described in 1896
Taxa named by Oskar Boettger
Taxonomy articles created by Polbot